Henningsen is a patronymic surname, created from the given name Henning. Notable people with the surname include:

Agnes Henningsen (1868–1962), Danish writer and activist
Alfred Meyer Henningsen (1918–2012), Norwegian politician
Ann Margarit Henningsen (born 1949), Mexican sprint canoer 
Casper Henningsen (born 1985), Danish footballer and business executive
Charles Frederick Henningsen (1815–1877), Belgian-American writer and military figure
Erik Henningsen (1855–1930), Danish painter and illustrator
Erika Henningsen (born 1992), American actress
Frants Henningsen (1850–1908), Danish painter and illustrator
Frits Henningsen (1889–1965), Danish furniture designer and cabinetmaker
Inge Henningsen (born 1941), Danish statistician 
Jan Henningsen (born 1954), Danish motorcycle racer
Juliane Henningsen (born 1984), Danish politician
Matt Henningsen (born 1999), American football player
Otto Henningsen (1883–1961), American politician
Poul Henningsen (1894–1967), Danish architect and writer 
Thorkild Henningsen (1884–1931), Danish architect 
Victor Henningsen (1924–2007), American businessman

See also
Henningsen v. Bloomfield Motors, Inc.

Patronymic surnames
Norwegian-language surnames
Danish-language surnames